Matthew J. Luloff (born c. 1984) is the Ottawa City Councillor for Orléans East-Cumberland Ward, a suburb of Ottawa, Ontario, Canada. Luloff is a Canadian Forces veteran and served in Afghanistan. He formerly worked for several members of parliament and most recently for the Minister of National Defence, Hon. Harjit Sajjan. Luloff holds a degree in Public Affairs and Policy Management from Carleton University and is a mental health advocate. As of 2018, he was a member of the Liberal Party of Canada.

Personal life
Luloff grew up in Orléans, graduated from St. Matthew High School, and spent his summers and weekends working as a lifeguard and instructor at a variety of pools including Bob McQuarrie Recreational Complex and The Ray Friel Centre. Following his service, Matthew attended the Arthur Kroeger College of Public Affairs at Carleton University in Ottawa.

He lives in Orléans with his wife Laura and their two daughters.

Music and podcast 
In addition to public service, Luloff is a musician. Starting at age 14, he has been involved in the local music scene in various bands and ensembles. Hearts&Mines, a manifestation of both his passion for Rock & Roll plus the traumas suffered while serving overseas.

Luloff also produces music on his own, ranging from electronic dance music through his Still Cities project, to acoustic self-titled solo albums, the newest of which is in the works and set for release sometime in 2021.

Additionally, Luloff hosts a regular podcast entitled Veteran X, a podcast about the scars of real battles "What we start to see is a common thread that a lot of people are feeling the exact same way so basically what Veteran X tells you is you're not alone."

Military service 
In 2003 he joined the Governor General's Foot Guards army reserve unit, participating in the Changing the Guard Ceremony on Parliament Hill for four summers and military exercises on the weekends.

Luloff then transferred to the regular force and moved to Manitoba in 2006 to train with the Princess Patricia's Canadian Light Infantry at the base in Shilo. After training as a reconnaissance patrolman, he deployed to Afghanistan in February 2008. Part way through the tour, he was assigned to a rifle platoon and helped to navigate foot patrols. He was stationed in small combat outposts along the Arghandab River, patrolling the volatile Panjwai-Zharey districts of Kandahar Province.

In 2009, Luloff was diagnosed with post-traumatic stress disorder and received a medical release from the Canadian Armed Forces.

Public service

Federal government 
Upon leaving the Canadian Armed Forces & completing a degree at the Arthur Kroeger College of Public Affairs at Carleton University in Ottawa, Luloff transitioned to a different form of public service, working for several members of Parliament, including John McKay and Judy Foote.

Following Justin Trudeau's Liberal Party election victory in 2015, Luloff began a role as Issues Manager in the office of Harjit Sajjan, Minister of National Defence.

Municipal councillor 
In October 2018, Luloff ran in a field of 17 candidates vying for the role of City Councillor for Orleans Ward, winning by a margin of almost 300 votes.

Because of his history with music, one of Luloff's first priorities was to expand the City of Ottawa's Public Library music instrument lending program, which he was successful with in November 2019. The program was expanded include four local branches thanks to donations from Sun Life Financial.

In addition to being named Deputy Mayor by Mayor Jim Watson, Luloff was also appointed the Council Liaison for Veteran and Military Issues. In this capacity, he launched the Veteran's Task Force, a network of partners working to inspire social responsibility, proactive collaboration and support for veterans and their families.

In 2020, Luloff was chosen by council to become the City's newest Chair of the Public Library Board. In this role, he set to work to abolish overdue penalties for book lending, joining only a handful of other public library systems to go fine-free. Explaining why this move was important Luloff explained, "We can talk as a board all we want about addressing racial and income inequality, or we can actually address racial and income inequality." Luloff led the board in 2022 in establishing a new intellectual freedom policy for the Ottawa Public Library, one of the most liberal and permissive in North America.

Luloff was chosen by council in December 2020 to replace Jenna Sudds as Chair of Community and Protective Services Committee.

Luloff was easily re-elected in the 2022 Ottawa municipal election in the re-named Orléans East-Cumberland Ward.

References 

Military personnel from Ottawa
Ottawa city councillors
Canadian military personnel of the War in Afghanistan (2001–2021)
1980s births
Living people
Carleton University alumni
Canadian podcasters
Canadian record producers